Melissa Peirce (born 1975) is an American country and pop music songwriter based in Nashville, Tennessee.

Early life and education
Peirce was born and raised in Bucks County, Pennsylvania. She moved to Nashville at age 18, and enrolled in Belmont University. She worked at Giant Records as an A&R assistant while writing songs at night, before joining Malaco Music Group as a songwriter.

Career
In 2004, Peirce won an ASCAP Award for writing Reba McEntire's "I'm Gonna Take That Mountain", launching her career. She co-wrote the Tyler Farr song "A Guy Walks Into a Bar", which reached number 1 on the Billboard Country Airplay chart.  The song also reached number 7 on the Billboard Hot Country Songs chart, number 51 on the Billboard Hot 100, and was named one of 11 Songs I Wish I'd Written at the 2015 Nashville Songwriters Hall of Fame ceremony. She has written singles including David Nail's "Red Light", which reached number 7 on the Billboard Country Airplay chart, Eli Young Band's "Say Goodnight" and Lady Antebellum's "Hurt". Her songs have also been recorded by Garth Brooks, Carrie Underwood, LeAnn Rimes, Joss Stone, Keith Urban and Olivia Holt.

Since 2012, she has been signed to Disney Music Publishing.

Personal life
Peirce is married to Your Guitar Sage Course Teacher Erich Andreas.

Awards
 ASCAP Country Music Award for "I'm Gonna Take That Mountain", 2004
 BMI Country Music Award for "Red Light", 2010
 NSAI Award for 10 Songs I Wish I Had Written, "A Guy Walks Into a Bar", 2015
 BMI Country Music Award for "A Guy Walks Into a Bar", 2016

Discography

Albums

As songwriter

References

External links
 

Living people
1975 births
American women songwriters
Songwriters from Tennessee
Songwriters from Pennsylvania
American country songwriters
Disney music
People from Bucks County, Pennsylvania
Belmont University alumni
21st-century American women musicians